Aconodes nepalensis is a species of beetle in the family Cerambycidae. It was described by Leopold Heyrovský in 1976. It is known from Nepal.

References

Aconodes
Beetles described in 1976